Lepidophloeus minusculus is a species of beetles in the genus Lepidophloeus. It was discovered in 1876 by French entomologist Antoine Henri Grouvelle.

References

Beetles described in 1876
Laemophloeidae